Yvan Attal (born ) is a French actor, scriptwriter and director.

Life and career
Born in Tel Aviv, Israel, to Algerian-Jewish parents. He grew up in the outskirts of Paris. His acting debut was in Éric Rochant's Un monde sans pitié (1989), which earned him a César Award for Most Promising Actor. His first feature film as director was Ma femme est une actrice (2001), which co-starred Charlotte Gainsbourg, Attal's real-life partner.

He directed a segment in the film New York, I Love You, and appeared as an actor in another.

He acted in The Interpreter and Anthony Zimmer, and in Rush Hour 3 he played a French cab driver named George.

Personal life
Attal's longtime partner is Anglo-French actress-singer Charlotte Gainsbourg whom he met on the set of the 1991 film Aux yeux du monde. Gainsbourg and Attal are not married, and Gainsbourg has attributed her reluctance to marry to the fact that her parents never married. Attal publicly proposed to Gainsbourg on 19 June 2013 during an awards ceremony when he received the French National Order of Merit. In April 2014, Attal confirmed that they were still unwed with no plans to marry.

Attal has three children with Gainsbourg. In 2014, following the death of Gainsbourg's sister, photographer Kate Barry, Attal and his family relocated to New York City.

Filmography
{| class="wikitable"
|- style="background:#B0C4DE;"
! Year
! Film
! Role
! Director
! Notes
|-
|1989
|Un monde sans pitié
|Halpern
|Éric Rochant
|César Award for Most Promising ActorActeurs à l'Écran – Michel Simon's Award
|-
|rowspan=3|1991
|Cauchemar Blanc 
|
|Mathieu Kassovitz
|Short film
|-
|Mauvais fille
|Vincent
|Régis Franc
|
|-
|Aux yeux du monde
|Bruno Fournier
|Éric Rochant 
|
|-
|rowspan=2|1992
|Amoureuse
|Paul
|Jacques Doillon
|
|-
|Love After Love
|Romain
|Diane Kurys
| 
|-
|1994
|The Patriots
|Ariel Brenner
|Éric Rochant
|
|-
|rowspan=3|1996
|Delphine 1, Yvan 0
|a man
|Dominique Farrugia
|
|-
|Portraits chinois
|Yves
|Martine Dugowson
|
|-
|Love, etc.
|Benoît 
|Marion Vernoux
|
|-
|rowspan=2|1997
|I Got a Woman (Short)
|Arnaud
|Yvan Attal
|Alpe d'Huez International Comedy Film Festival – Best Short Film
|-
|Saraka bô
|Taïeb 
|Denis Amar
|
|-
|rowspan=2|1998
|Alissa
|Luc Kaufmann
|Didier Goldschmidt
|
|-
|Cantique de la racaille
|Gaston
|Vincent Ravalec
|
|-
|rowspan=3|1999
|Mes amis
|Eric
|Michel Hazanavicius
|
|-
|With or Without You
|Benoit
|Michael Winterbottom
|
|-
|The Criminal
|Mason
|Julian Simpson
|
|-
|2000
|Le prof
|Hippolyte 
|Alexandre Jardin
|
|-
|2001
|My Wife Is an Actress
|Yvan
|Yvan Attal
|Cabourg Romantic Film Festival – Best DirectorNominated – César Award for Best Debut
|-
|rowspan=2|2002
|And Now... Ladies and Gentlemen
|David
|Claude Lelouch
|
|-
|At Dawning (Short)
|Falling Man
|Martin Jones
|
|-
|rowspan=2|2003
|It's Easier for a Camel...
|Man in park
|Valeria Bruni Tedeschi
|
|-
|Bon Voyage
|Raoul
|Jean-Paul Rappeneau
|Nominated – César Award for Best Supporting Actor
|-
|rowspan=2|2004
|Happily Ever After
|Vincent
|Yvan Attal
|
|-
|Un petit jeu sans conséquence
|Bruno
|Bernard Rapp
|
|-
|rowspan=4|2005
|The Interpreter
|Philippe
|Sydney Pollack
|
|-
|Anthony Zimmer
|François Taillandier 
|Jérôme Salle
|
|-
|Somewhere (Short)
|Simon
|Emmanuel Murat
|
|-
|Munich
|Tony (Andreas' Friend)
|Steven Spielberg
|
|-
|2006
|The Serpent
|Vincent Mandel
|Eric Barbier
|
|-
|rowspan=2|2007
|Le candidat
|Michel Dedieu
|Niels Arestrup
|
|-
|Rush Hour 3
|George
|Brett Ratner
|
|-
|rowspan=2|2008
|La traque (TV Movie)
|Serge Klarsfeld
|Laurent Jaoui
| 
|-
|Orange Juice (Short)
|Philippe
|Ronan Moucheboeuf
|
|-
|rowspan=5|2009
|Je suis venu pour elle
|Max
|Ivan Taieb
|
|-
|The Ball of the Actresses
|Himself
|Maïwenn
|
|-
|Leaving
|Samuel
|Catherine Corsini
|Nominated - Globes de Cristal Award for Best Actor
|-
|Les regrets
|Mathieu Liévin
|Cédric Kahn
|
|-
|Rapt
|Stanislas Graff
|Lucas Belvaux
|Nominated – César Award for Best Actor
|-
|rowspan=2|2011
|Dans la tourmente
|Max
|Christophe Ruggia
| 
|-
|R.I.F.
|Stephane Monnereau 
|Franck Mancuso
|
|-
|rowspan=2|2012
|One Night
|Pierre Morvand
|Lucas Belvaux
|
|-
|Do Not Disturb
|Ben Azuelos 
|Yvan Attal
|
|-
|2013
|Delicate Gravity (Short)
|Paul
|Philippe Andre
|Palm Springs International ShortFest – Best of Festival Award
|-
|rowspan=2|2014
|Le Dernier Diamant
| Simon Carrerra
|Éric Barbier
| 
|-
|Son épouse
| Joseph de Rosa
|Michel Spinosa
| 
|-
|rowspan=3|2016
|En Moi
|the filmmaker
|Laetitia Casta
|Short film
|-
|The Jews
|Yvan
|Yvan Attal
|Also director and screenwriter
|-
|Heaven Will Wait 
|
|Marie-Castille Mention-Schaar
|
|-
| rowspan=3|2017
|Raid dingue
|Viktor
|Dany Boon
|
|-
|Rock'n Roll
|Yvan Attal
|Guillaume Canet
|
|-
|Le Brio
|
|Yvan Attal
|
|-
| 2018
|Ad Vitam
|Darius
|Thomas Cailley
|TV series - 6 episodes
|-
| rowspan=2|2019
| Seberg
| Romain Gary
| Benedict Andrews
|-
|My Dog Stupid
|Henri Mohen
|Yvan Attal
| based on the short story of the same name from John Fante's novella West of Rome
|-
| rowspan="2" | 2021
| The Accusation
| 
| Yvan Attal
| based on the 2019 novel of the same name by Karine Tuil
|-
|Stuck Together
|Gabriel
|Dany Boon
|
|-
|2022
|The Sitting Duck'''
|Luc Oursel
|Jean-Paul Salomé
|
|-
| 2023
|Bardot|Raoul Lévy
|Danièle Thompson and Christopher Thompson
|TV series
|}Allmovie

 Dubbing 
(French version)
Tom Cruise :
 Docteur William 'Bill' Harford : Eyes Wide Shut Ethan Hunt : Mission: Impossible 2 David Aames : Vanilla Sky John Anderton : Minority ReportJames McAvoy :
 Penelope'' : Max

References

External links 
 

1965 births
Living people
Most Promising Actor César Award winners
French male film actors
20th-century French Jews
Jewish French male actors
Jewish Israeli male actors
Knights of the Ordre national du Mérite
Cours Florent alumni
20th-century French male actors
21st-century French male actors
Film directors from Paris
Israeli emigrants to France
Birkin family